The three-lobed suckermouth (Chiloglanis trilobatus) is a species of upside-down catfish native to the Lake Rukwa drainage of Tanzania and Zambia.  This species grows to a length of  TL.

References

External links 

Chiloglanis
Catfish of Africa
Fish of Tanzania
Fish of Zambia
Fish described in 1996
Taxa named by Lothar Seegers
Taxonomy articles created by Polbot